The 1990 Prudential-Bache Securities Classic (known as such in 1990 for sponsorship reasons) was a men's tennis tournament played on outdoor hard courts. It was the 6th edition of the event known that year as the Prudential-Bache Securities Classic, and was part of the ATP World Series of the 1990 ATP Tour. It took place in Orlando, United States, from April 2 through April 8, 1990. First-seeded Brad Gilbert won the singles title.

Finals

Singles

 Brad Gilbert defeated  Christo van Rensburg 6–2, 6–1
It was Gilbert's 2nd singles title of the year, and the 19th of his career.

Doubles

 Scott Davis /  David Pate defeated  Alfonso Mora /  Brian Page, 6–3, 7–6(7–5)
It was Davis' 1st doubles title of the year, and the 11th of his career. It was Pate's 1st doubles title of the year, and the 10th of his career.

References

External links
 ITF tournament edition details